Rumbaut is a surname. Notable people with the surname include:

Julio Rumbaut (born 1952), Cuban-American media executive 
Rubén G. Rumbaut, Cuban-American sociologist